The men's sanda (as Sanshou) 56 kg competition at the 2010 Asian Games in Guangzhou, China was held from 13 November to 17 November at the Nansha Gymnasium.

A total of fourteen competitors from fourteen different countries competed in this event, limited to fighters whose body weight was less than 56 kilograms.

Li Xinjie from China won the gold medal after beating Phan Văn Hậu of Vietnam in gold medal bout 2–0, Li won both periods by the same score of 5–0. The bronze medal was shared by Khwanyuen Chanthra from Thailand and Phoxay Aphailath of the Lao People's Democratic Republic.

Athletes from Afghanistan (Khalid Hotak), South Korea (Lim Seung-chang), Macau (Wong Man Kuan) and Kyrgyzstan (Mirbek Suiumbaev) shared the fifth place. Athletes from Nepal, India, Hong Kong, Philippines, Uzbekistan and Yemen lost in the first round and didn't advance to the next round.

Schedule
All times are China Standard Time (UTC+08:00)

Results
Legend
AV — Absolute victory

References

External links
Official website

Men's sanda 56 kg